Antoniadi is a large lunar impact crater that lies on the southern hemisphere on the far side of the Moon. The crater intrudes into the southeastern rim of the crater Minnaert, a slightly smaller formation that is significantly more eroded. Attached to the eastern rim of Antoniadi is Numerov, another large, ancient crater similar to Minnaert. Due south of Antoniadi is the small crater Brashear.

Geography
The outer rim of Antoniadi is generally circular, with an irregular edge that has multiple indentations all about the perimeter. The wall is only lightly eroded, and retains a crisp rim and terracing on the inner walls. Only a single small craterlet of note lies across the interior wall, near the southeast edge of the rim.

Antoniadi is one of the few craters on the Moon that possesses both a second inner ring and a central peak. This inner ring formation is about half the diameter of the outer wall, and only rugged mountain segments of the ring to the north and south still remain. The western part of the inner ring is almost non-existent, and only a few minor hills remain to the east.

The floor within the inner wall is unusually flat and smooth, with the central peak being the only notable feature. The floor outside the inner ring is much rougher in texture. The most notable crater on the interior floor lies across the eastern edge of the southern inner ring range.

Lowest Point on the Moon

The bottom of a small unnamed crater within Antoniadi crater was measured by the laser altimeter (LALT) instrument on board the Japanese Selenological and Engineering Explorer (SELENE) satellite to be the lowest point on the moon, at Lunar latitude 70.43° S, longitude 187.42° E. The point is 9.178 km below the average lunar geoid. The measurement was confirmed by laser altimetry data from the Chang'e 1 orbiter, which further refined the location to latitude 70.368° S, longitude 172.413° W.

The lowest point has been unofficially named "Point Trieste" after the Bathyscaphe Trieste, the first vehicle to descend to the Earth's deepest point.

References 

Cited

General

External links
 

Impact craters on the Moon